The  is an electric multiple unit (EMU) train type operated by the private railway operator Seibu Railway on commuter services in the Tokyo area of Japan since 1993.

Design
The 9000 series trains were built between 1993 and 1999 at Seibu's own Tokorozawa Factory by combining electrical equipment from former 101 series EMUs with new steel bodies based on the New 2000 series design. These were the last trains to be built at the Tokorozawa Factory before it closed in 2000.

Fleet
, the fleet consists of eight 10-car sets, numbered 9101 to 9108, based at Musashigaoka depot for use on Seibu Ikebukuro Line workings.

Formations
10-car sets are formed as shown below with six motored ("M") cars and four non-powered trailer ("T") cars.

 Cars 2, 5, and 8 are each equipped with one single-arm pantograph.

Interior
Seating consists of longitudinal bench seating throughout. Wheelchair spaces are provided in cars 2 and 9. Priority seats are provided at the end of each car.

History
The first train entered service in 1993, with eight 10-car sets built by 1999. The fleet was refurbished between 2004 and 2008, with new underframe equipment and VVVF inverter control. Refurbished sets are identified by stickers on the cab end doors.

Livery variations

"Red Lucky Train"

From July 2014, set 9103 was repainted in a "Red Lucky Train" livery in collaboration with the private railway operator Keikyu. In return, Keikyu painted one of its own N1000 series sets into an all-over yellow livery similar to the Seibu livery in May 2014.

"L-train"

From 17 January 2016, set 9108 operates in a special "L-train" livery consisting of the Saitama Seibu Lions baseball team colour of dark blue with Seibu Lions logos. The train is scheduled to carry this livery for a period of approximately three years.

"Seibu KPP Train"

From 4 June 2016, set 9101 operated in a special "Seibu KPP Train" pink livery to mark the 100th anniversary of Seibu Railway in 2015 and the fifth anniversary of singer Kyary Pamyu Pamyu. The train operated in this livery until 29 September 2016, after which date the Kyary Pamyu Pamyu vinyls were removed, with the trainset operating in all-over pink livery.

References

External links

 Seibu 9000 series train information 

Electric multiple units of Japan
9000 series
Train-related introductions in 1993
1500 V DC multiple units of Japan